Donkarai is a village in Y. Ramavaram Mandal, East Godavari district in the state of Andhra Pradesh in India.

Demographics 
According to the 2011 Indian census the village had a population of 2194, out of which 997 were male and 1197 were female. The percentage of children below 6 years of age was 12%. The literacy rate was 56%.

References 

Villages in Y. Ramavaram mandal